Roccaforte Mondovì (Vivaro-Alpine: Ròcafuòrt, Ròcafòrt, or Rocafòrt) is a comune (municipality) in the Province of Cuneo in the Italian region Piedmont, located about  south of Turin and about  southeast of Cuneo.

Roccaforte Mondovì borders the following municipalities: Briga Alta, Chiusa di Pesio, Frabosa Sottana, Magliano Alpi, Ormea, Pianfei, and Villanova Mondovì.

References

Cities and towns in Piedmont